Susanna Nicchiarelli (born 6 May 1975) is an Italian director, actress and screenwriter.

Biography
Nicchiarelli graduated in Philosophy at the Sapienza University in Rome and gained a PhD in Philosophy at the Scuola Normale in Pisa and a Directing degree at the Centro Sperimentale di Cinematografia in 2004.

After having written and directed many short films and documentaries, her first film Cosmonaut was acclaimed at the 2009 Venice Film Festival and gained her a nomination as Best New Director for the David di Donatello Awards and the Nastri d'Argento Awards, while her second film, Discovery at Dawn, based on the book by Walter Veltroni was presented at the 2012 Rome Film Festival.

Her third film, Nico, 1988, a biopic on German singer Nico, was presented at the 2017 Venice Film Festival and was critically acclaimed, gaining four David di Donatello Awards, including the Award for Best Original Screenplay.

Partial filmography

Director/screenwriter
 Cosmonaut (2009)
 Discovery at Dawn (2012)
 Nico, 1988 (2017)
 Miss Marx (2020)
 Chiara (2022)

Actress
 Cosmonaut (2009)
 Discovery at Dawn (2012)

References

External links

 
 

1975 births
Living people
Film people from Rome
Italian film directors
Italian film actresses
Italian screenwriters
Italian women screenwriters